Tom Amstutz (born August 30, 1955) is a former American football player and coach.  He served as the head football coach at the University of Toledo from 2001 to 2008, compiling a 58–41 record, including a 39–24 mark in conference play. Known as "Toledo Tom", he is a native of Toledo, Ohio.  Amstutz played college football at Toledo from 1974 to 1976.  He was a longtime assistant coach at Toledo, from 1977 to 1986 and from 1990 to 2000.  From 1987 to 1989, Amstutz served as an assistant coach at the United States Naval Academy.

In 2008, Amstutz's final season at Toledo, the Rockets became the first ever, and to date, only, Mid-American Conference team to defeat the Michigan Wolverines.  Amstutz served as the radio analyst for Rocket football broadcasts for the 2010 season, over the Rocket Sports Radio Network.

Head coaching record

References

1955 births
Living people
College football announcers
Navy Midshipmen football coaches
Toledo Rockets football announcers
Toledo Rockets football coaches
Toledo Rockets football players
Sportspeople from Toledo, Ohio
Players of American football from Ohio